Triennial elections for all 73 cities and districts, twelve regional councils and all district health boards (DHBs) in New Zealand were held on 13 October 2007. Most councils were elected using the first-past-the-post voting method, but eight (of which Wellington City was the largest) were elected using single transferable vote.

STV voting method
The single transferable vote (STV) method was first used at the 2004 local elections, when ten districts and city councils employed this alternative to first-past-the-post voting (FPP). Of those ten, two district councils—Papakura and Matamata-Piako—reverted to FPP. The remaining eight councils that used STV in 2007 were Kaipara, Thames-Coromandel, Kapiti Coast, Porirua, Wellington, Marlborough, Dunedin, and the Chatham Islands.

All DHBs have been using STV since the 2004 local elections.

Results

New mayors were elected in Auckland City, North Shore City, Manukau City, Christchurch, Rodney District, Whangarei, Far North District, Nelson, Taupo, Stratford, South Taranaki District and Buller District.

Voter turnouts were generally lower than normal for local body elections in New Zealand.

Peter Chin was re-elected in the Dunedin mayoral election.

North Island

 Bay of Plenty Regional Council (Environment BOP)
 Western Bay of Plenty District Council
 Tauranga City Council
 Opotiki District Council
 Whakatane District Council
 Rotorua District Council (part)
 Kawerau District Council
 Taupo District Council (part)
 Gisborne District Council (unitary authority)
 Hawke's Bay Regional Council
 Wairoa District Council
 Taupo District Council (part)
 Hastings District Council
 Napier City Council
 Central Hawke's Bay District Council
 Rangitikei District Council (part)
 Taranaki Regional Council
 New Plymouth District Council
 Stratford District Council (part)
 South Taranaki District Council
 Manawatū-Whanganui Regional Council (Horizons Regional Council; horizons.mw)
 Ruapehu District Council
 Stratford District Council (part)
 Rangitikei District Council (part)
 Wanganui District Council
 Manawatu District Council
 Palmerston North City Council
 Tararua District Council
 Horowhenua District Council
 Wellington Regional Council (Greater Wellington Regional Council; Greater Wellington—The Regional Council)
 Masterton District Council
 Kapiti Coast District Council
 Carterton District Council
 South Wairarapa District Council
 Upper Hutt City Council
 Porirua City Council
 Hutt City Council *
 Wellington City Council

See also
 2007 Christchurch mayoral election
 2007 Wellington City mayoral election

References

External links
 Elections New Zealand
  Local Authority Election Statistics 2007 (Provided by the Department of Internal Affairs)
 New Zealand STV information site  (Provided by the Department of Internal Affairs)
 STV and FPP in New Zealand local body elections (Provided by the Department of Internal Affairs)
 The results of the 2007 elections (on The New Zealand Herald website)

Local 2007
Local elections
October 2007 events in New Zealand